Pepi Lederer (born Josephine Rose Lederer; March 18, 1910 – June 11, 1935) was an American actress and writer. She was the niece of actress and philanthropist Marion Davies. A high-spirited young woman, Lederer was a lesbian who had relationships with actresses Louise Brooks and Nina Mae McKinney. Due to either her sexual orientation or a drug addiction, Lederer was involuntarily committed to a psychiatric ward at the behest of either Davies or influential partner, newspaper tycoon William Randolph Hearst.

On June 11, 1935, the 25-year-old Lederer took her own life by jumping from the sixth floor window of her hospital room at Good Samaritan Hospital. A later obituary printed by Hearst's flagship newspaper, The San Francisco Examiner, depicted Lederer's suicide as an accidental mishap, and her involuntary hospitalization was attributed to "a nervous breakdown caused by overstudy". Lederer is buried at Hollywood Forever Cemetery in Los Angeles.

Family and early years 
Born Josephine Rose Lederer in Chicago in 1910, Lederer was the daughter of Reine Davies (née Douras)—a stage actress and sister of Rosemary and Marion Davies—and her first husband George W. Lederer, a Broadway theatrical producer and director.  Lederer had a younger brother, Charles (known as "Charlie"), who later became a well-known screenwriter who co-wrote the critically acclaimed film  His Girl Friday (1940).

In early childhood, Lederer was nicknamed "Peppy" due to her high spirited personality.  At the age of 18, she changed the spelling to "Pepi" and legally changed it to her first name.

Due to her mother's alcoholism, Lederer and her brother were cared for by their aunt, Marion Davies. The children lived in Davies' luxurious Beverly Hills estate. Lederer's mother, Reine, would occasionally appear uninvited and accuse Davies of having "robbed her of her children."

When Davies became the mistress of publishing tycoon William Randolph Hearst, Lederer and her brother moved with Davies to the Hearst Castle where she spent much of her early youth during the 1920s. Also at this time, Lederer attended the  Westlake School for Girls in Los Angeles, California where she graduated in 1926.

Life at Hearst Castle 

As Lederer was "the only fixed reality in an endless procession of celebrities" at Hearst Castle, she often defied the rules set by Hearst and Davies regarding proper decorum and usually escaped unpunished. She often played pranks on Hearst's important guests such as stealing actress Claire Windsor's "false bosom" and writer Elinor Glyn's red wig while they slept. She delighted in inventing outlandish stories about fictitious events at Hearst Castle, and she planted these stories in Louella Parsons' syndicated gossip column much to Hearst's annoyance.

Although Hearst and Davies took the ambitions of her brother Charles seriously and encouraged him to pursue a career as a screenwriter, they regarded Lederer's ambitions to be an actress far less seriously. Nevertheless, Davies secured a part for her niece in her 1927 film The Fair Co-Ed. Lederer was devastated when her part was cut from the film. Her reaction surprised Davies who still thought Lederer's acting ambitions were fleeting. Davies promised to get Lederer another role in an upcoming film, but her acting career would ultimately consist only of a few small parts in Davies' films.

In December 1929, Lederer upset Davies and Hearst after a mutual acquaintance told them she was involved in a sexual relationship with African-American actress Nina Mae McKinney. During Pepi's affair with Nina Mae McKinney at Davies' Beverley Hills estate on Lexington Road, neighbors became irate at seeing black people on the adjacent premises and telephoned Davies. Davies' sister Ethel visited the premises and found Lederer in bed with McKinney. Outraged, Davies and Hearst shipped Lederer to New York City where she lived alone in an apartment at 42 West Fifty-fourth Street and continued having romantic relationships with women. During this period of exile, Lederer became close friends with actress Alma Rubens, and both women allegedly shared an addiction to drugs including heroin and morphine. Rubens died a year later in January 1931.

At the end of March 1930, while still in New York, Lederer discovered that she was pregnant. Advised by her aunt Marion, Lederer had an abortion, but she suffered complications which caused her serious health problems. It was later revealed that a male acquaintance had raped Lederer on New Year's Eve of 1929.

Later years and death 

After recovering from the abortion, Lederer traveled with her aunt and William Randolph Hearst to Europe in 1930. While staying in England, Lederer convinced Hearst to hire her to work as a writer for one of his magazines, The Connoisseur. Lederer enjoyed the job and would remain in London for the next five years. She was given a generous allowance from Davies and Hearst. Lederer later told her friend, Louise Brooks, that she was happy living in London and felt that for the first time in her life, she was her own person.

In April 1935, Lederer returned to the United States with her new girlfriend, Monica Morris, whom she met in London. The couple first arrived in New York City where they stayed at William Randolph Hearst’s suite at the Ritz Tower. After a few weeks, the two left for Los Angeles where they stayed at Marion Davies' Beverly Hills mansion on Lexington Road. Davies and Hearst remained at San Simeon but, in an unusual move, did not contact Lederer or invite her to any parties at San Simeon.

As a result of either her drug addiction or her sexual orientation, Hearst had Lederer involuntarily committed to the psychiatric ward of Good Samaritan Hospital at 1212 Shatto Street in late May 1935. On June 11, 1935, Lederer took her own life by distracting her nurse with a request for food and then jumping from the sixth floor window of her hospital room. According to her nurse Marion Pope, Lederer had been sitting in her hospital bed reading a motion picture magazine and asked for something to eat. "I turned just in time," Pope recalled, "to see Miss Lederer plunge against the window screen.... and she fell out."

Lederer plummeted six stories to the shrubbery below the window, and she broke her neck upon striking the ground. Hospital attendants rushed to the shrubbery, but she died within several minutes. She was 25 years old. In early newspaper obituaries, Lederer's suicide was ascribed to "acute melancholia" by her doctor, Samuel Hirshfeld. Hirshfeld was a frequent visitor at San Simeon and a personal acquaintance of Hearst. However, in a later obituary printed by Hearst's flagship newspaper The San Francisco Examiner, Lederer's suicide was instead depicted as an accidental mishap, and her involuntarily hospitalization was attributed to "a nervous breakdown caused by overstudy".

Two days after her suicide, a funeral service was held in the Church of St. Mary of the Angels on June 13, 1935. The Reverend Neal Dodd—who only a few weeks prior conducted funeral rites in the same church for Judge Bernard J. Douras, Pepi's grandfather—officiated the service. Lederer's body was then interred in the family mausoleum at Hollywood Forever Cemetery in Los Angeles. Her pallbearers included Harpo Marx, Buster Collier, Orry Kelly, Ted Draper, Harry Crocker, Matt Moore, William Haines, and Jimmie Shields—William Haines' longtime gay partner.

References

Notes

Citations

Works cited

External links 
 
 

1910 births
1935 suicides
20th-century American actresses
20th-century American women writers
American film actresses
American silent film actresses
American lesbian actresses
American lesbian writers
LGBT people from Illinois
Suicides by jumping in California
American people of German descent
Writers from Chicago
20th-century American LGBT people
Harvard-Westlake School alumni